Stemonyphantes is a genus of sheet weavers that was first described by Anton Menge in 1866.

Species
 it contains twenty species, found in Asia, Canada, and the United States:
Stemonyphantes abantensis Wunderlich, 1978 – Turkey
Stemonyphantes agnatus Tanasevitch, 1990 – Ukraine, Russia, Georgia, Azerbaijan
Stemonyphantes altaicus Tanasevitch, 2000 – Russia, Kazakhstan
Stemonyphantes blauveltae Gertsch, 1951 – USA, Canada
Stemonyphantes conspersus (L. Koch, 1879) – Central Europe to Kazakhstan
Stemonyphantes curvipes Tanasevitch, 1989 – Kyrgyzstan
Stemonyphantes griseus (Schenkel, 1936) – Kyrgyzstan, China
Stemonyphantes grossus Tanasevitch, 1985 – Kyrgyzstan
Stemonyphantes karatau Tanasevitch & Esyunin, 2012 – Kazakhstan
Stemonyphantes lineatus (Linnaeus, 1758) (type) – Europe, Caucasus, Russia to Central Asia, China
Stemonyphantes menyuanensis Hu, 2001 – China
Stemonyphantes mikhailovi Omelko & Marusik, 2021 – Russia (Far East)
Stemonyphantes montanus Wunderlich, 1978 – Turkey
Stemonyphantes parvipalpus Tanasevitch, 2007 – Russia
Stemonyphantes serratus Tanasevitch, 2011 – Turkey
Stemonyphantes sibiricus (Grube, 1861) – Russia (mainland, Kurile Is.), Kazakhstan, Mongolia
Stemonyphantes solitudus Tanasevitch, 1994 – Turkmenistan
Stemonyphantes taiganoides Tanasevitch, Esyunin & Stepina, 2012 – Russia, Kazakhstan
Stemonyphantes taiganus (Ermolajev, 1930) – Russia
Stemonyphantes verkana Zamani & Marusik, 2021 – Iran

See also
 List of Linyphiidae species (Q–Z)

References

Araneomorphae genera
Linyphiidae
Spiders of Asia
Spiders of North America